Forest Park Southeast Historic District is a historic district roughly bounded by Chouteau Ave., Manchester and Cadet Aves., Kingshighway Blvd., and S. Sarah St. in St. Louis, Missouri.  It was added to the National Register of Historic Places in 2001.  Architecture in the district includes Colonial Revival and Romanesque styles.  Buildings in the district include single and multiple dwellings, a specialty store, a religious structure and a meeting hall.  A boundary increase added 
4170-4370 (even) and 4229-4341 (odd) Manchester Ave. to the district in 2005.  A second boundary increase added 4121–25, 4127–29, 4131, 4133, 4137, 4139–41, 4143, 4145, 4501–07, 4509–11, 4510, and 4512-14 Manchester Ave. in 2007.

References

Colonial Revival architecture in Missouri
Historic districts on the National Register of Historic Places in Missouri
National Register of Historic Places in St. Louis
2001 establishments in Missouri
Tourist attractions in St. Louis